Involution Ocean is a science-fiction novel by American writer Bruce Sterling, published in 1977.

Plot summary
Involution Ocean is a novel about a drug addict who joins the crew of a whaling ship on the planet Nullaqua when the drug is outlawed, to get near the whales which are the source of the drug.

Reception
Howard Thompson reviewed Involution Ocean in The Space Gamer No. 15. Thompson commented that "Sterling's plot and world hang together in believable fashion if you ignore science."

Reviews
Review by Larry Niven (1978) in Science Fiction Review, May 1978
Review by Richard E. Geis (1978) in Science Fiction Review, July 1978
Review by Tom Hosty (1979) in Foundation, #15 January 1979
Review by Joseph Nicholas (1979) in Paperback Parlour, December 1979
Review [French] by Roger Bozzetto (1980) in Fiction, #306
Review [German] by Joachim Körber? (1981) in SF Perry Rhodan Magazin, 1/81
Review [German] by Heinz J. Baldowé? (1981) in Science Fiction Times, #150 September/Oktober 1981
Review [German] by uncredited (1982) in Reclams Science Fiction Führer
Review by Martyn Taylor (1989) in Paperback Inferno, #77
Review by Stephen E. Andrews and Nick Rennison (2006) in 100 Must-Read Science Fiction Novels
Kliatt

References

1977 American novels
1977 science fiction novels
American science fiction novels
Jove Books books
Novels by Bruce Sterling